Debravation is the fourth solo album by American singer Deborah Harry, released in July 19, 1993. It was the final album Harry made whilst signed to the Chrysalis label, thus ending a successful partnership that began with her time as a member of Blondie and had endured for over 15 years. The album reached No. 24 in the UK Albums Chart.

The US version of the album contains two additional tracks, including "My Last Date (With You)", which features instrumental backing from R.E.M.

Debravation was re-issued in 2005 by Wounded Bird Records.

Single releases
The first single from the album was the dance track "I Can See Clearly", which reached No. 23 in the UK. The second single, ballad "Strike Me Pink", had a controversial promotional video that was banned for being too disturbing – it featured a man in a glass tank filled with water, as Harry sits and watches him drown.

Track listing

Additional tracks

Personnel

 Deborah Harry – vocals
 Chris Stein – guitar, programming
 Guy Pratt – guitar, keyboards, drum programming
 Pete Min – guitar
 Tim Renwick – guitar
 Stuart Kimball – guitar
 Mike Hehir – guitar
 J.J. Belle – guitar
 Chester Kaymen – guitar
 Danny Wilensky – saxophone
 Phil Todd – saxophone
 Andy Paley – piano, drums, background vocals
 Steve Piggott – keyboards
 Danny Schogger  – keyboards
 Anne Dudley – keyboards
 Jon Astley – keyboards
 Carrie Boothe – keyboards, background vocals
 Tony McIlwaine – keyboards, programming
 Arthur Baker – keyboards, programming
 Nikolai Vorkapich – keyboards, programming
 Lenny Dee – keyboards, programming
 Eric Kupper – keyboards, programming
 Steve Rimland  – keyboards, programming
 Richard T. Norris – keyboards, programming
 Toni C. (Antoinette Colandero) – keyboards, programming
 Leigh Foxx – bass guitar
 Andy Pask – bass
 Steve Barnacle – bass
 Geoff Dugmore – drums
 Jeffery CJ Vanston – synthesizer drums
 Frank Ricotti – percussion
 Ian Wilson – background vocals
 Tessa Niles – background vocals
 Linda Taylor – background vocals
 Katie Kissoon – background vocals
 Andy Caine – background vocals
 John Williams – background vocals
 Jonathon Paley – background vocals
 R.E.M. – performance on "My Last Date with You"

Production

 Arthur Baker – producer on "I Can See Clearly"
 Chris Stein – producer on "Stability", "Rain", "Dancing Down the Moon", "The Fugitive" and "Dog Star Girl",
 Anne Dudley – producer on "Strike Me Pink" and "Mood Ring"
 Jon Astley – producer on "Rain" and "Keep On Going"
 Guy Pratt – producer on "Communion"
 Adam Yellin – producer/recording engineer/mixing engineer
 Toni C. – producer on "Lip Service"
 John Williams – producer on "Standing In My Way"
 R.E.M. – producers on "My Last Date With You"
 Andy Paley – producer on "My Last Date With You", "Tear Drops"
 Chris Lord-Alge – additional production and mixing on "Communion"
 Kennan Keating – sound engineer
 Louis Scalise – sound engineer
 Andy Cardenas – sound engineer
 Neil McLellan – sound engineer
 Mike O'Hora – sound engineer
 Roger Dudley – sound engineer
 Glenn Skinner – sound engineer
 Bill Esses – sound engineer
 Darrin Tidsey- sound engineer
 Geoff Foster – sound engineer
 Rich Travali – sound engineer
 Dean Chamberlain – art direction, photography
 Gary Kurfirst – art direction, management

Debravation Producer's Cut
In 1994, Harry released independently a different version of the album, entitled Debravation (8½) Producer's (Director's) Cut. According to her official website, this was the original version of the album, which was presented to Sire and rejected. When they opted for a different track listing and different mixes, Harry had a limited number of copies of Debravation (8½) Producer's (Director's) Cut pressed and sold them at her concerts and through her website. It contained two identical tracks to the official release, but also included alternate versions, as well as tracks that were used as B-sides, and some previously unreleased material.

The musicians for the Producer's Cut were Chris Stein (guitar and programming), Pete Min (guitar), Leigh Foxx (bass) and Geoff Dugmore (drums).  On the live version of "Black Dog", the musicians were Steve Barnacle (bass); Carrie Boothe (keyboards); Geoff Dugmore (drums); Karl Hyde (guitar); and Melissa Poole-Stein (backing vocals). This version was engineered and mixed by Adam Yellin and produced by Chris Stein.

References

Debbie Harry albums
1993 albums
Albums produced by Jon Astley
Albums produced by Arthur Baker (musician)
Chrysalis Records albums
R.E.M.
Sire Records albums
Reprise Records albums
Wounded Bird Records albums
Albums produced by Chris Stein
Albums produced by Anne Dudley
Albums produced by Guy Pratt
Albums produced by John Owen Williams (record producer)